Patterson railway station is located on the Frankston line in Victoria, Australia. It serves the south-eastern Melbourne suburb of Bentleigh, and it opened on 28 May 1961.

Named after Patterson Road, which is located immediately south of the station and also provides access, construction of the station commenced in 1958.

From its opening, provision was made for another platform face on the western side of the station. On 28 June 1987, it came into use, when a third track was provided between Caulfield and Moorabbin.

On 17 December 1994, a deliberately lit fire damaged parts of the station.

Platforms and services

Patterson has one island platform with two faces and one side platform. It is serviced by Metro Trains' Frankston line services.

Platform 1:
  all stations services to Flinders Street, Werribee and Williamstown

Platform 2:
  all stations services to Flinders Street, Werribee and Williamstown; all stations services to Frankston

Platform 3:
  morning peak-hour all stations services to Frankston

References

External links
 Melway map at street-directory.com.au

Railway stations in Melbourne
Railway stations in Australia opened in 1961
Railway stations in the City of Glen Eira